The Royal Baking Powder Company was one of the largest producers of baking powder in the US.

History
It was started by brothers Joseph Christoffel Hoagland and Cornelius Nevius Hoagland in 1866,  It later came under the ownership of William Ziegler, and then his adopted son, William Ziegler Jr.

In 1929, the Royal Baking Powder Co., along with four other companies including the Fleischmann's Yeast Company, merged to form Standard Brands, the number-two brand of packaged foods in America after General Foods. Through a further merger, Standard Brands itself became part of Nabisco in 1981. As of 2017, Nabisco is a subsidiary of Mondelez International; Royal Baking Powder is still marketed today, currently by Hulman & Company.

References

External links
 
 
 

Baking powder
Food product brands
Food and drink companies of the United States